The following article presents a summary of the 2021–22 football season in Croatia, which is the 31st season of competitive football in the country.

National teams

Croatia

Croatia U21

Croatia U19

Croatia U17

Croatia Women's

Croatia Women's U19

Croatia Women's U17

League tables

Croatian First Football League

Croatian Second Football League

Croatian clubs in Europe

Summary

Dinamo Zagreb

Osijek

Rijeka

Hajduk Split

ŽNK Osijek

Hajduk Split U19

References